Nathan Rempel (born February 7, 1977) is a retired Semi professional ice hockey player, Rempel was born in Winnipeg, Manitoba, Canada.

Career
Rempel left on 27 April 2009 the Peterborough Phantoms and signed for the up-coming season with Guildford Flames.

Honours

Privates
He holds the British passport.

Career statistics
Season	Team	                Lge	GP	G	A	Pts	PIM	GP	G	A	Pts	PIM
1994-95 Saskatoon Blades 	WHL 	61 	6 	5 	11 	94 	10 	1 	0 	1 	11
1995-96 Saskatoon Blades 	WHL 	59 	15 	11 	26 	65 	4 	1 	0 	1 	4
1996-97 Saskatoon Blades 	WHL 	65 	18 	24 	42 	161 	--	--	--	--	--
1997-98 Saskatoon Blades 	WHL 	62 	21 	28 	49 	123 	6 	1 	5 	6 	18
1998-99 Peterborough Pirates 	BNL 	20 	26 	19 	45 	85 	6 	1 	2 	3 	16
1999-00 Canadian National Team 	Intl 	23 	2 	6 	8 	61 					
2000-01 Manitoba Moose 	        IHL 	12 	0 	1 	1 	19 	--	--	--	--	--
2000-01 Florida Everblades 	ECHL 	8 	0 	1 	1 	9 	--	--	--	--	--
2000-01 Greensboro Generals 	ECHL 	22 	2 	2 	4 	31 	--	--	--	--	--
2001-02 Louisiana IceGators 	ECHL 	60 	7 	10 	17 	99 	5 	1 	0 	1 	0
2002-03 Louisiana IceGators 	ECHL 	67 	25 	28 	53 	150 	5 	4 	0 	4 	2
2003-04 Bracknell Bees 	        BNL 	35 	28 	21 	49 	28 					
2004-05 Cardiff Devils 	        EIHL 	62 	24 	28 	52 	56 					
2005-06 London Racers 	        EIHL 	23 	9 	8 	17 	24 	--	--	--	--	--
2005-06 Cardiff Devils 	        EIHL 	29 	13 	12 	25 	43 	--	--	--	--	--
2006-07 Cardiff Devils 	        EIHL 	52 	16 	21 	37 	35 					
2006-07 Team Great Britain      WC1B     5       3       0       3       2
2007-08 Peterborough Phantoms   EPL     40      30      34      64      83      22      19      23      42      12
2008-09 Peterborough Phantoms   EPL     54      54      49      103     22
2009-10 Guildford Flames        EPL     55      40      28      68      46
2010-11 Guildford Flames        EPL     56      59      33      92      32       4      4       4       8       00  
Junior Totals                           247     60      68      128     443     20      3       5       8       33
Britain Pro Totals                      370     240     220     460     422     32      24      29      53      28
North America Pro Totals                169     34      42      76      308     10      5       0       5       2

All Levels                              870     398     369     767     1268    60      30      33      63      63

External links
 
 Profile on eurohockey.net

References

1977 births
Living people
Ice hockey people from Winnipeg
Saskatoon Blades players
Canadian ice hockey left wingers
Canadian Mennonites